Perley may refer to:

People

Given name
 Perley G. Nutting (1873–1949),  American optical physicist, and the founder of the Optical Society of America (OSA).
 Perley B. Johnson (1798–1870),  American politician and U.S. Representative from Ohio.
 Perley A. Thomas (1874–1958),  Canadian-born American industrialist and entrepreneur.
 Perley Keyes (1774–1834),  American politician from New York
 Perley Ason Ross (1883–1938),  American experimental physicist who worked, carefully and without seeking publicity, at some essential problems in the behaviour of X-rays.
 Perley Dunn Aldrich (1863–1933),  vocal teacher, composer and conductor

Middle name 

 George Perley Phenix (1864–1930), American university president and teacher

Surname 
 George Halsey Perley (1857–1938), American born Canadian politician and diplomat
 Mary Elizabeth Perley (1863–?), American educator and author
 William Goodhue Perley (1820–1890), businessman and member of the Canadian House of Commons from 1887 to 1890

Places

Canada
 Perley Bridge (1931–1998),  a bridge connecting Hawkesbury, Ontario and Grenville, Quebec
 Perley River, a stream in Quebec

United States
 Perley, Minnesota

Enterprises
 Perley A. Thomas Car Works,  a 20th-century builder of wooden and steel streetcars, based in High Point, North Carolina in the United States.